The men's discus throw event at the 2008 World Junior Championships in Athletics was held in Bydgoszcz, Poland, at Zawisza Stadium on 8 and 9 July 2008.  A 1.75 kg (junior implement) discus was used.

Medalists

Results

Final
9 July

Qualifications
8 July

Group A

Group B

Participation
According to an unofficial count, 31 athletes from 23 countries participated in the event.

References

Discus throw
Discus throw at the World Athletics U20 Championships